Dániel Kovács (born 16 June 1990 in Békéscsaba) is a Hungarian football player who currently plays for Újpest FC.

References
Hivatasos Labdarugok Szervezete
UEFA Official Website
Daniel Kovacs signs for Ujpest(2009.09.02)

External links
Békéscsaba 1912 Előre SE Official Website

1990 births
Living people
People from Békéscsaba
Hungarian footballers
Association football midfielders
Békéscsaba 1912 Előre footballers
Újpest FC players
Gyirmót FC Győr players
Nemzeti Bajnokság I players
Sportspeople from Békés County
21st-century Hungarian people

hu:Kovács Dániel